Titakudi taluk is a taluk of Cuddalore district of the Indian state of Tamil Nadu. The headquarters of the taluk is the town of Tittakudi.

Demographics
According to the 2011 census, the taluk of Tittakudi had a population of 2,62,289 with 1,321,390  males and 1,329,899 females. There were 987 women for every 1000 men. The taluk had a literacy rate of 63.41. Child population in the age group below 6 was 146,042 Males and 127,390 Females.

References 

Taluks of Cuddalore district